was a Japanese video game magazine that specialized in covering arcade games. Published by Shinseisha, it first began in May 1986 and originally published bi-monthly, later changed to be a monthly-issued magazine in the late 1980s. The magazine also featured the annual "Gamest Awards", which hands out awards to games based on user vote. The magazine had a heavy-focus on shoot 'em up arcade games, but would also cover games from other genres. Gamest originated from the bi-monthly fanzine VG2 Newsletter from the early 1980s. The magazine ran for several years, with its final issue being released in September 1999. Following the bankruptcy of publisher Shinseisha, many editors would move to ASCII and create a successor magazine, Monthly Arcadia.

History 

On the cover of the first issue of read . Initially it covered arcade games with an emphasis on 2D Shoot 'em ups. From issue 6 on, it appeared monthly and from issue 116 (1994) the magazine was published twice a month.

In the mid-90s, the magazine covered mainly the then booming versus fighting game genre. In 1999, the magazine was discontinued without a final issue due to the sudden bankruptcy of the publisher Shinseisha. Thereafter, much of the Gamest staff transferred to the publisher ASCII (currently Enterbrain) who launched the arcade game magazine .

Table of contents
Gamest was subdivided into the following sections:
 
 Report
 Comic

Notes

References

External links
 Gamest PDF magazine archive (incomplete)
 List of all Gamest issue contents 

1986 establishments in Japan
1999 disestablishments in Japan
Bi-monthly magazines
Biweekly magazines published in Japan
Defunct magazines published in Japan
Education magazines
Monthly magazines published in Japan
Video game magazines published in Japan
Magazines established in 1986
Magazines disestablished in 1999
Magazines published in Tokyo